Stray Dogs is a 2014 South Korean thriller film starring Kim Jeong-hoon, Cha Ji-heon and Myung Kae-nam. It is co-written and directed by first-time director Ha Won-jun.

Plot
While searching for him, his car breaks down and he is stuck at the village.

Although the village seems peaceful, it is hiding a hideous secret – a young woman Kim Eun-hee (Cha Ji-heon), a long time resident, has inadvertently become the sexual plaything for the perverted and pathetic elder village men. When Yoo-joon tries to help Eun-hee, he finds himself on a violent collision course with the locals and the village chief Jang Gi-no (Myung Kae-nam).

Cast
 Kim Jeong-hoon as So Yoo-joon
 Cha Ji-heon as Kim Eun-hee
 Hwang Young-hee as Ham Bok-soon
 Myung Kae-nam as Jang Gi-no
 Lee Jae-po as Han Dong-goo 
 Jo Duk-je as Choi Yong-gil 
 Kim Seong-gi as Lee Jong-gook

Reception

References

External links
 
 
 

2014 films
2014 thriller films
2010s Korean-language films
South Korean thriller films
2010s South Korean films